Anciens Etablissements Pieper was a Belgian arms manufacturer established under the name Henri Pieper in Herstal, Belgium in 1884 (some sources, 1866), by Henri Pieper. In 1898, it was renamed to Nicolas Pieper, and it became the Anciens Etablissements Pieper in 1905. It stayed in business until approximately 1950. The company used the Bayard trade name (after a well-known medieval knight de Bayard) and manufactured the Bergmann–Bayard pistol and the Bayard 1908 pistol.

Pieper

From 1897, the company also produced cars. In 1900, Henri Pieper introduced a hybrid vehicle with an electric motor/generator, batteries, and a small gasoline engine.  It used the electric motor to charge its batteries at cruise speed and used both motors to accelerate or climb a hill. The Pieper factory was taken over by Imperia, after Pieper died.

Auto-Mixte, also of Belgium, built vehicles from 1906 to 1912 under the Pieper patents.

References

External links
 unblinkingeye.com
 Pieper
 History of hybrid vehicles

Weapons manufacturing companies
Herstal